Pascal Elias Saikaly is a Lebanese Professor of Environmental Science and Engineering.  He is best known for the use of omics for applied studies of microbiology in engineered and natural wastewater treatment systems, including bioelectrochemistry, membrane bioreactors, and granular sludge.

Saikaly collaborates with and leads teams of scientist and engineers who have developed novel approach to harvest electrical energy from wastewater while simultaneously producing useful byproducts. In particular, he combines advances from nanotechnology and materials research with advances from microbial ecology to develop devices to create bioelectricity. This work supports the long-term strategic efforts of the King Abdullah University of Science and Technology to research and commercialize alternative sources of energy. Saikaly's research addresses broader issues of importance in water-limited environments, including the use of seawater for toilet flushing.

Education 

Saikaly earned his B.S. and M.S. from the American University of Beirut.  In 2005, he completed his Ph.D. at the University of Cincinnati. From 2005 to 2007, he was completed postdoctoral studies at North Carolina State University. From 2008 to 2010, he was an assistant professor at the American University of Beirut. In 2010, he joined the faculty of King Abdullah University of Science and Technology, where he is currently an associate professor.

Bibliography 

Saikaly has more than 100 publications listed on Scopus that have been cited a total of more than 3000 times, giving him an h-index of more than 30. His most cited articles include:
<li>
<li>
<li>

References

External links 

Google Scholar

Environmental scientists
Living people
University of Cincinnati alumni
Academic staff of King Abdullah University of Science and Technology
Year of birth missing (living people)